The National Company of Radio and Television (SNRT;) is the public broadcaster of Morocco.

History
It was formerly called Moroccan Radio and Television (RTM) from 1956 and Radiodiffusion-Télévision Marocaine (RTM) from 1961. Radio-Maroc was one of the founding members of the European Broadcasting Union in 1950 and continued as an active member until 1 January 1961 when RTM changed its affiliation to associate membership. In 1969 RTM was readmitted as an active member.

In 2009, the SNRT became a shareholder in Euronews, initially acquiring 0.33% then later expanding its share to 6% in 2011.

In 2021, Othman El Ferdaous, the Minister of Culture, announced that SNRT would be reorganized into a public holding group by 2024, during which it would acquire the part-state-owned 2M and private Medi 1 Radio and Medi 1 TV channels. In addition, its Aflam TV channel would be replaced with an "SVOD" video-on-demand platform.

On 12 November 2022, Arryadia obtained rights to broadcast 10 matches including the Moroccan national team for the 2022 FIFA World Cup.

Role as a public broadcaster

In the exercise of its public service function, among the obligations of the SNRT Corporation are:

 Promote dissemination and awareness of constitutional principles and civic values.
 Guarantee the objectivity and truthfulness of the information provided, while ensuring that a broad range of views is presented.
 Facilitate democratic debate and the free expression of opinion.
 Promote the territorial cohesion and linguistic and cultural diversity of Morocco.
 Offer access to different genres of programming and to the institutional, social, cultural, and sporting events that are of interest to all sectors of the audience, paying attention to those topics that are of special interest to the public.
 To serve the widest audience, ensuring maximum continuity and geographical and social coverage, with a commitment to quality, diversity, innovation, and high ethical standards.

Services

Television
SNRT currently runs eight television channels:
Al Aoula (SNRT 1): also called TVM; the first television channel of SNRT. The station broadcasts in mainly Arabic and French, with daily news bulletins in Berber and Spanish. 
Al Aoula HD
Arryadia (SNRT 3 SAT): a national sports channel.
Arryadia HD
Arryadia TNT (SNRT 3 TNT)
Athaqafia (SNRT 4): an educational and cultural channel.
Al Maghribia (SNRT 5): an international satellite TV channel.
Assadissa (SNRT 6): a religious services and affairs channel.
Aflam TV (SNRT 7): a film channel which is broadcast via DVB-T only.
Tamazight TV (SNRT 8): a Berber-language channel.
Laayoune TV (SNRT Laayoune): a regional channel targeting audiences in the Southern Provinces.

Pending ownership
The following channels are pending acquisition by SNRT as of June 2021:
2M (SNRT 2): a semi-public generalist channel.
Medi 1 TV: a news channel covering Moroccan and international news. The channel was fully acquired by CDG Invest, which plans to transfer it to SNRT once it meets legal requirements.

https://snrtnews.com/ is the news website affiliated to SNRT, created in March 2021, is committed to presenting quality content by emphasizing the credibility and neutrality of information.

Radio
SNRT currently runs four national radio stations and ten regional radio stations.

National stations
SNRT Radio National
SNRT Chaîne Inter
SNRT Radio Amazigh
SNRT Radio Mohammed VI du Quran

Regional stations
SNRT FM Agadir
SNRT FM Casablanca
SNRT FM Dakhla
SNRT FM Fès
SNRT FM Laâyoune
SNRT FM Marrakech
SNRT FM Meknès
SNRT FM Oujda
SNRT FM Tanger
SNRT FM Tétouan

Pending ownership
As of 2021, Medi 1 Radio is pending acquisition by SNRT.

Online media
SNRT offers an online portal at snrt.ma. The website is managed by SNRT's Interactive Media department and allows users to listen and watch live feeds of the network's radio and television stations. The portal also features blogs, news stories.

References

External links

 

 
Television stations in Morocco
European Broadcasting Union members
Multilingual broadcasters
Television channels and stations established in 1956
1956 establishments in Morocco